Tsalka Canyon is part of Khrami (known as Ktsia at it source ) gorge near Dashbashi village, 3 km from small town of Tsalka, in Tsalka Municipality, in Kvemo Kartli region of southeastern Georgia, 1,110-1,448 meters above sea level. The distance from Tsalka Canyon to the popular Algeti National Park is 42 km.>

Morphology 
Tsalka Canyon was created by erosion in volcanic plateau. Canyon is about 7 km long, as measured from canyon beginning at elevation 1448 meters above sea level to the end at elevation 1110 meters above sea level. Canyon depth is 300 meters on average.

Biodiversity 
The vegetation on volcanic plateau, where canyon formed, is rather sparse in stark contrast with the different micro-landscape in the canyon.  Variety of plants on the steep slopes of the canyon and waterfalls is supported by characteristic micro-climate.

Tourist attractions 

Tsalka Canyon is known for it astounding cascading waterfalls, that  provide chill in the summer. Tsalka Waterfall takes exotic emerald color and forms dozens of frozen waterfalls in the winter. In waterfall vicinity it is also warmer in the winter than in nearby Tsalka and Dashbashi village. On the way to canyon through Tsalka there are ruins of medieval  fortress, the center of resistance of Kldekari principals against Georgian kings.

The Diamond Bridge spans 240m across, suspended 280m above the canyon. The bridge is the longest and tallest free-hanging structure in the world.

See also 
Samshvilde Canyon Natural Monument
Algeti National Park
Kldekari (mountain)
Kldekari-Rkoni Monastery
List of natural monuments of Georgia

References

Natural monuments of Georgia (country)
Canyons and gorges of Georgia (country)
Geography of Kvemo Kartli
Protected areas established in 2013